Sellebakk is a community in the town of Fredrikstad in Norway. It is located in the former municipality Borge, on the eastern bank of Glomma. Lisleby is located to the west.

Sellebakk is also sometimes written as Selbak. The local sports team is Selbak TIF.

References

Populated places on the Glomma River
Fredrikstad